Maria Selmaier (born 12 December 1991) is a German wrestler. She represented her country at the 2016 Summer Olympics. She finished in 18th place in the women's freestyle 75 kg division.

She qualified for the 2016 Summer Olympics at the second Olympic Qualification Tournament held in Istanbul, Turkey.

References

External links
 

1991 births
Living people
German female sport wrestlers
Olympic wrestlers of Germany
Wrestlers at the 2016 Summer Olympics
European Wrestling Championships medalists
21st-century German women